Benjamin Ernest Kish (March 31, 1917 – February 24, 1989) was a professional American football safety in the National Football League for the Brooklyn Dodgers and Philadelphia Eagles.  He was also a member of the "Steagles", a team that was the result of a temporary merger between the Eagles and Pittsburgh Steelers due to the league-wide manning shortages in 1943 brought on by World War II. He played college football at the University of Pittsburgh and was drafted in the eighth round of the 1940 NFL Draft.

References

External links
 

1917 births
1989 deaths
American football safeties
Brooklyn Dodgers (NFL) players
Drexel Dragons football coaches
Philadelphia Eagles players
Pittsburgh Panthers football players
Steagles players and personnel
[[Category:People from Tonawanda, New York]